Flávio Abel Sousa Cerqueira (born 9 May 1985 in Porto) is a Portuguese retired footballer who played as a central defender.

External links
 

1981 births
Living people
Footballers from Porto
Association football defenders
Portuguese footballers
Primeira Liga players
Boavista F.C. players
S.C. Espinho players
C.D. Aves players
S.C. Salgueiros players
S.C. Dragões Sandinenses players
Vitória F.C. players
Leça F.C. players
A.D. Lousada players
U.S.C. Paredes players
AD Oliveirense players
S.C. Coimbrões players